Qamsar (also Qamşar, Ghamsar and Kamsār) is a small town in central Iran. It is the administrative centre of the Qamsar District, which forms part of Kashan County is 15 km south of Kashan in the Province of Isfahan. In the 2006 census the population was 3,566, in 1,048 families.

From the 13th century and possibly considerably earlier, cobalt was mined near Qamsar. The metal oxide was exported all over the Muslim world for use as the cobalt blue pigment in the decoration of pottery. It is possible that the cobalt ore was also exported to China.  In 1301 Abū'l-Qāsim, who came from a family of tilemakers based in Kashan, wrote a treatise on the manufacture of fritware ceramics in which he mentions the village as a source of cobalt ore. Albert Houtum-Schindler visited the village at the end of the 19th century when Qamsar was "a large and flourishing village of about three hundred houses with extensive gardens with fine roses used for the manufacture of rosewater." He described the processing and marketing of the cobalt containing ore.
 
Ghamsar is host to one of the biggest festivals of Iran called Golabgiri to celebrate the production of rose water in spring.

References

Further reading

Populated places in Kashan County
Cities in Isfahan Province